The Tree of Peace Memorial Plaque (Slovak: Pamätná plaketa Stromu pokoja) is the highest award awarded since 2019 by the Slovak non-governmental organization Servare et Manere. The award was first awarded on December 4, 2019 on the occasion of planting Tree of Peace by Zuzana Čaputová, President of Slovakia at Brokwood cemetery in United Kingdom.

Criteria 
Servare et Manere expresses the highest gratitude by awarding a Tree of Peace Memorial Plaque, which may be granted to the Heads of the states, who are personally involved in planting, or people and governmental or non-governmental organizations who have made a special contribution to spreading ideas of understanding and union among nations, as well as have made a major contribution to the spreading and implementation of the project. This award cannot be given In Memoriam and a number of laureates is limited to 20 people including organizations. Laureates are included in a special register. The award was established on December 1, 2019. The Tree of Peace Memorial Plaque can be awarded at any time.

Appearance 
The one-sided plaque is struck from copper, its diameter is 100 mm and on the obverse is the embossed year of establishment of the award: 2019. The award, together with the decree, meets all phaleristic criteria.

List of Laureates 

 Zuzana Čaputová, President of the Slovak Republic. Plaque № 001, awarded on December 4, 2019.
 Ľubomír Rehák, Ambassador Extraordinary and Plenipotentiary of the Slovak Republic to the Court of St. James's in London. Plaque № 002, awarded on December 4, 2019.
 Her Majesty Queen Margrethe II of Denmark. Plaque № 003, awarded on April 16, 2020.
 His Majesty Kiingi Tuheitia Pootatau Te Wherowhero VII, Maaori King. Plaque № 004, awarded on June 19, 2022).
 His Excellency Edouard Fritch, President of French Polynesia. Plaque № 005, awarded on June 29, 2022 at the Presidential Palace in Papeete.

References

External links 

 

Awards established in 2019
International awards
Peace awards